Hrubá Borša or Nagyborsa (in ,  in ) is a village and municipality in western Slovakia in  Senec District in the Bratislava Region.

History
In historical records the village was first mentioned in 1244.

Geography
The municipality lies at an altitude of 125 metres and covers an area of 5.848 km2. It has a population of 386 people.

Demography
Population by nationality:

Genealogical resources

The records for genealogical research are available at the state archive "Statny Archiv in Bratislava, Banska Bystrica, Bytca, Kosice, Levoca, Nitra, Presov, Slovakia"

 Roman Catholic church records (births/marriages/deaths): 1711-1898 (parish B)
 Lutheran church records (births/marriages/deaths): 1786-1896 (parish B)
 Reformated church records (births/marriages/deaths): 1889-1910 (parish B)

See also
 List of municipalities and towns in Slovakia

References

External links
  Official page
Surnames of living people in Hruba Borsa

Villages and municipalities in Senec District